George Stephen Sparrow (20 November 1869 – 6 April 1933) was an Australian rules footballer who played with South Melbourne and both played for and coached St Kilda in the Victorian Football League (VFL).

Football
Nicknamed 'Sugar', Sparrow began his career in the Victorian Football Association playing for Richmond, where he was captain for two years.

He joined the VFL in its second season, and after having to sit out 1897 to gain a clearance, represented South Melbourne before switching to St Kilda the following year.

After retiring, Sparrow turned to coaching and was appointed senior coach of St Kilda in 1913. He coached the club to its first ever Grand Final: the Saints had defeated Minor Premiers Fitzroy in the Final, but under the rules at the time, Fitzroy had an automatic right of challenge, and they won the Grand Final the following week.

Sparrow quit as coach at the end of 1913, coaching five games as caretaker coach in 1920. He returned again in 1928, this time for a two-season stint, with the Saints finishing sixth, missing the finals on percentage. In 1929 he coached St Kilda to the finals again, with a Semi Final loss ending the club's season.

He finished with a winning percentage of 58.73% as a coach.

Notes

References
 Holmesby, Russell and Main, Jim (2007). The Encyclopedia of AFL Footballers. 7th ed. Melbourne: Bas Publishing.
 Football Favorites, The Weekly Times, (Saturday, 18 May 1895), p.13
 Football: Season 1895 Senior Captains, The Weekly Times, (Saturday, 18 May 1895), p.10

External links

1869 births
Australian rules footballers from Melbourne
Sydney Swans players
St Kilda Football Club players
St Kilda Football Club coaches
Preston Football Club (VFA) coaches
Richmond Football Club (VFA) players
Preston Football Club (VFA) players
1933 deaths
People from St Kilda, Victoria